Parliamentary elections were held in Syria on 5 March 2003. The number of seats reserved for the parties in the National Progressive Front was 167, and that reserved for independents 83.

Results

Syria
Parliamentary election
Parliamentary elections in Syria
Election and referendum articles with incomplete results